Cyperus kurzii is a species of sedge that is endemic to the Andaman Islands.

The species was first formally described by the botanist Charles Baron Clarke in 1884.

See also
 List of Cyperus species

References

kurzii
Taxa named by Charles Baron Clarke
Plants described in 1884
Flora of the Andaman Islands